Trifurcula helladica is a moth of the family Nepticulidae. It is found in Greece (Peloponnisos and Crete).

The wingspan is 4-4.4 mm.

External links
Seven New Species Of The Subgenus Glaucolepis Braun From Southern Europe (Lepidoptera: Nepticulidae, Trifurcula)

Nepticulidae
Moths of Europe
Moths described in 2007